Wilson Edgar Pereira Alegre (born July 22, 1984 in Huambo) is an Angolan football goalkeeper who currently plays for Libolo.

Career
Wilson has played for Recreativo Caála since 2008, and has been their number 1 ever since.

International career
Wilson also has been capped by the Angolan national football team with his debut taking place in early 2010 in a 2010 African Nations Cup warm up game.

He was also included in the 2010 African Nations Cup along with other goalkeepers Lamá and Carlos.

References

External links
Wilson at Footballdatabase

1984 births
Living people
People from Huambo Province
Angolan footballers
Angola international footballers
2010 Africa Cup of Nations players
2012 Africa Cup of Nations players
Expatriate footballers in Portugal
Académica Petróleos do Lobito players
C.D. Primeiro de Agosto players
C.R. Caála players
C.R.D. Libolo players
G.D. Interclube players
S.L. Benfica (Luanda) players
Imortal D.C. players
Progresso da Lunda Sul players
Girabola players
2011 African Nations Championship players
People from Huambo
Association football goalkeepers
Angola A' international footballers